The Red River or Red Water is an important feature in the mythological geography of Chinese literature, including novels and poetry over a course of over two millennia from the Warring States to early Han dynasty era poetry of the Chuci onward. The Red River is one of the mythological rivers said to flow from Kunlun, a mythological land, with mountainous features. Translations into English include "Scarlet River".

Mythical geography

Chinese mythology and imagination developed an extensive collection of ideas related to a mythical geography. Put together, these could form a picture of an exotic land usually thought to be located somewhere "in the west". Sometimes, as the areas to the west were charted, real geographical features would be named for mythological ones. It is also possible that the reverse process also occurred, as stories or legends formed from actual geographic phenomena were incorporated into mythical geography.

Nearby features
Various mythological geography is associated with the Red River, including one or more of the eight mountain pillars, especially the (mythological) Kunlun Mountain, the Weak River, the Black River, and intervening terrain, such as the Moving Sands. Jade Mountain was also in the vicinity (Yang 2005: 160-162).

Ideas

As the mythology of the Red River and related mythical geography developed, it was influenced by ideas from the cosmology of India related to Mount Sumeru as an axis mundi, together with related cosmological features, such as rivers (Christie 1968:74). India was the goal of the Buddhist priest Xuanzang and his companions in the Journey to the West, in which India became part of a fictional geography, as well as all the land between it and Tang China (Yu 1977, passim).

Poetry 

The Red River is an allusion in various Chinese Classical poems, the early Chuci anthology included. Pulled through the sky by a team of dragons, Qu Yuan soars above all obstacle rivers and hostile terrain at will during his spirit journey as described in his poem "Li Sao". The Li Sao helped set the tone for other poems of the Chuci, which also allude to this type of mythical geography. In the "Li Sao", Qu Yuan, on a spiritual journey, which he describes as being pulled in a chariot by winged dragons, leaves the Ford of Heaven in the morning and reaches Kunlun by nightfall. On the way, in line 350 of the "Li Sao" (according to David Hawkes' line numbering), Qu Yuan comes to the banks of the Red Water (or River). This is one of the colored rivers flowing from Kunlun. Qu Yuan encounters this right after reaching the Moving Sands (Hawkes 1985, 78, 94 and 334). Qu Yuan then surmounts the Red Water, or River, by summoning water dragons to make a bridge, then being conducted across by a Deity of the West (lines 351-352).

Western Paradise

The Red River was often thought to flow from Kunlun, sometimes located in the south seas area and sometimes considered to be the focal point of a Western Paradise. It is sometimes said that this Paradise was presided over by Xiwangmu, the Queen Mother of Meng Hao in the West, in later accounts was relocated to a palace protected by golden ramparts, within which immortals (xian) would feast (Christie 1968: 78-79), and inhabited by various other exotic beings, such as Wu or shamans, who were conceived of as people that practiced divination, prayer, sacrifice, rainmaking, and healing: they specialized in traveling by spirit flight, induced through the usual shamanic means.

Shanhaijing

The Shanhaijing forms an interesting intersection between Red Water/Red River mythology and geography, because it the borderline between what is based on reality and what is purely imaginary is unclear in this book. The Shanhaijing discusses the Red River in chapter 16 (Yang 2005, 162).

Real Red Rivers

There are various modern rivers, or parts of rivers, in modern China known by a name meaning "Red River". In ancient times, the sources of these rivers often were not known by people down stream, and they often created mythological explanations for the sources of these rivers, such as mythological rivers flowing from "Kunlun". For example, the official source of the longest river in Asia: the Yangzi ("Yangtze", in older versions) main head water source is what is sometimes known in Mongolian as Ulaan Mörön, meaning "Red River" (it is also known by other names, such as the Tuotuo River). It is worth noting that the use of "Yanngzi" to refer to the whole river is relatively recent, classically and in ancient times, this was only used to describe the lower reaches, with other names used for the upper stretches. Another of Asia's major rivers is also named the Red River. With a source in the Hengduan Mountains, it flows into the ocean through northern Vietnam. The study of the relationship between real rivers and mythological rivers is complicated by the various name changes or variations in names for the real rivers over time, including often interchangeable Chinese characters for "water", "river", or "stream". Although the relationship between real and mythological geography such as rivers is not always clear, but one open to further study.

See also
Chinese mythological geography: general information
Chinese mythology: a general article on Chinese mythology
Classical Chinese poetry: a general article on Classical Chinese poetry
Jinsha River
List of Chinese mythology
List of mythological Chinese rivers
Weak River (mythology)

References
Christie, Anthony (1968). Chinese Mythology. Feltham: Hamlyn Publishing. .
Hawkes, David, translation, introduction, and notes (2011 [1985]). Qu Yuan et al., The Songs of the South: An Ancient Chinese Anthology of Poems by Qu Yuan and Other Poets. London: Penguin Books. 
Yang, Lihui, et al. (2005). Handbook of Chinese Mythology. New York: Oxford University Press. 
Yu, Anthony C., editor, translator, and introduction (1980 [1977]). The Journey to the West. Chicago and London: The University of Chicago Press. 

Locations in Chinese mythology
Mythological rivers
Chinese poetry allusions
Asia in mythology